Mikael Johansson (born June 28, 1995) is a Swedish ice hockey player. He is currently playing with the Fife Flyers in the UK's Elite Ice Hockey League (EIHL).

Johansson made his Swedish Hockey League debut playing with Växjö Lakers during the 2013–14 SHL season.

References

External links

1995 births
Living people
Swedish ice hockey forwards
Fife Flyers players
Kristianstads IK players
IK Oskarshamn players
IK Pantern players
SG Cortina players
Växjö Lakers players
People from Växjö
Sportspeople from Kronoberg County
Swedish expatriate ice hockey people
Swedish expatriate sportspeople in Scotland
Swedish expatriate sportspeople in Italy
Swedish expatriate sportspeople in Austria
Expatriate ice hockey players in Austria
Expatriate ice hockey players in Scotland
Expatriate ice hockey players in Italy